The Huincul Formation is a geologic formation of Late Cretaceous (Early Cenomanian to Late Turonian) age of the Neuquén Basin that outcrops in the Mendoza, Río Negro and Neuquén Provinces of northern Patagonia, Argentina. It is the second formation in the Río Limay Subgroup, the oldest subgroup within the Neuquén Group. Formerly that subgroup was treated as a formation, and the Huincul Formation was known as the Huincul Member.

Description 
The type locality of the Huincul Formation is near the town of Plaza Huincul in Neuquén Province after which the formation was named by Wichmann in 1929. This formation conformably overlies the Candeleros Formation, and it is in turn overlain by the Lisandro Formation.

The Huincul Formation is thought to represent an arid environment with ephemeral or seasonal streams. It is mainly composed of green and yellow sandstones and can easily be differentiated from the overlying Lisandro Formation, which is red in color. The Candeleros Formation, underlying the Huincul, is composed of darker sediments, making all three formations easily distinguishable.

Fossil content 

Fossil bones are rarely found in the Huincul Formation. However, remains of Argentinosaurus huinculensis, one of the largest land animals known, were found in the Huincul Formation, and this species is named after it. One of the largest terrestrial predators known, Mapusaurus, has also been recovered from a bonebed in this formation.

Fossils found in the Huincul Formation include those of dinosaurs:

 several titanosaurian sauropods (including Argentinosaurus, Choconsaurus, and Chucarosaurus)
 rebbachisaurid sauropods (including Cathartesaura and Limaysaurus)
 carcharodontosaurid theropods (including Mapusaurus, Meraxes and Taurovenator)
 a possible neovenatorid theropod (Gualicho)
 a megaraptoran theropod (Aoniraptor)
 several abelisaurid theropods (including Skorpiovenator, Tralkasaurus and Ilokelesia)
 an elaphrosaurine theropod (Huinculsaurus)
 a paravian theropod (Overoraptor)
 several iguanodonts
 ichnofossils of abelisaurids and hadrosaurids

See also 
 List of fossil sites
 List of dinosaur bearing rock formations

References

Bibliography 
 

 
 
 
 

 
Geologic formations of Argentina
Cretaceous Argentina
Sandstone formations
Fluvial deposits
Lacustrine deposits